Olga Novikova (born 23 January 1973) is a Russian luger. She competed in the women's singles event at the 1994 Winter Olympics.

References

External links
 

1973 births
Living people
Russian female lugers
Olympic lugers of Russia
Lugers at the 1994 Winter Olympics
Place of birth missing (living people)